Adaina costarica is a moth of the family Pterophoridae. It is found in Costa Rica.

The head is scaled and ochreous-white. The antennae are pale ochreous-while. The thorax, tegulae, mesothorax and abdomen are yellow-white. The forewings are yellow-white with brown markings and yellow-white fringes. The underside is pale brown. The hindwings are grey-brown with grey fringes. The underside is pale brown.

Adults have been recorded in July.

Etymology
The species is named after the country of its discovery.

References

Moths described in 1992
Oidaematophorini